Shigeru Ishimoto (1913-2007) was a Japanese politician.  She served as Minister of the Environment (Japan) from 1984 to 1985. She was the fourth woman to become a Cabinet minister in Japan.

References

 https://pubmed.ncbi.nlm.nih.gov/3851966/

20th-century Japanese women politicians
20th-century Japanese politicians
1913 births
2007 deaths
Women government ministers of Japan